In the United States, a hall monitor may be either a student volunteer who is charged with maintaining order in a school's corridors, or an adult paraprofessional staff member who carries out similar duties, sometimes in conjunction with other functions. Students may be selected as hall monitors because they are considered mature and responsible enough, or they may be appointed in rotation.

Duties and functions
While specific duties vary between establishments, hall monitors typically check hall passes; maintain overall good conduct in the corridors; and ensure that students are punctual in attending classes. Hall monitors may also be posted to a school's doors in order to prevent unauthorized entry during recess, in which case they may be known as door monitors.

At some schools, a hall monitor may receive extra privileges and authority not afforded to other students.

In other countries
In Malta, a few schools have monitors, mostly door, class and hall monitors. Their job is not to let anyone into classes before the lessons start and during recess. Class monitors are like prefects but only stay with the class until the teacher arrives for the first lesson in the morning or right after recess.

In Ontario, Canada, Hall Monitors (if present at all) are not student volunteers, but actual paid security guards who patrol corridors and maintain security within a secondary school. There may be 1-4 hall monitors, depending on the size of the secondary school. 

In India, the title is only for a monitor who has responsibilities for assisting teachers in class.

In South Korea, monitors do not walk around the hall. In the morning, they are stationed all around the school, looking for students who aren't wearing their school uniforms properly, or who are late for school. They apprehend them and write down their names so that they will get demerit points. If they get too many points, they will be subject to disciplinary action, such as having to do community service work for the school. If they get even more points after that, or an extremely high number of points, then suspension/expulsion is considered. 

School terminology
Positions of authority